The 1955 British Grand Prix was a Formula One motor race held at Aintree on 16 July 1955. It was race 6 of 7 in the 1955 World Championship of Drivers. British driver Stirling Moss led a Mercedes 1–2–3–4 domination of the race, to win his first Formula One race narrowly ahead of his illustrious Argentine teammate Juan Manuel Fangio. Several people, including Moss, believed that the Argentine allowed his British protégé to claim his debut win in front of his home crowd. This was, however, at Moss' inquiry, consistently denied by Fangio, who claimed that Moss "was simply faster that day."

Subsequent to the race, the German, Swiss and Spanish Grands Prix were cancelled, in the wake of the Le Mans disaster. With only one Championship round therefore remaining (the Italian Grand Prix some 2 months later), Fangio's points advantage over Moss was sufficient to secure his third World Drivers' Championship.

Classification

Qualifying

Race

Notes
 – Includes 1 point for fastest lap

Shared drives
 Car #16: Mike Hawthorn (60 laps) and Eugenio Castellotti (27 laps).
 Car #28: Ken Wharton (50 laps) and Harry Schell (22 laps).
 Car #36: Tony Rolt (10 laps) and Peter Walker (9 laps).

Championship standings after the race 
Drivers' Championship standings

Note: Only the top five positions are included.

References

British Grand Prix
British Grand Prix
British Grand Prix
British Grand Prix